The 11th International Gold Cup was a Formula Two motor race, held on 19 September 1964 at Oulton Park, Cheshire. The race was run over 40 laps of the circuit, and was won from pole position by Jack Brabham in a Brabham BT10. Jim Clark in a Lotus 32 finished just two tenths of a second behind Brabham, setting fastest lap. Jackie Stewart was third in another Lotus 32.

Results

References

Formula Two races
International Gold Cup
International Gold Cup